The New Hamburg Firebirds are a Junior ice hockey team based in New Hamburg, Ontario, Canada.  They are members of the Provincial Junior Hockey League of the Ontario Hockey Association.

History
The Hahns started out in the Interbrew Junior "C" Hockey League, and later joined the Central Junior C Hockey League.  They made the jump up to the Midwestern Junior B Hockey League in 1977 and stayed there until 1982 when they returned to Junior "C" in the NJCHL.

While in the Central Jr. C league (now known as the Western Jr. C league), the Hahns won two Clarence Schmalz Cups as All-Ontario champions - 1963 and 1967.

After some uncertainty in the Summer of 2013, the Firebirds ended up in the new Midwestern Junior C Hockey League. In 2016 the eight Junior 'C' hockey leagues in Southern Ontario amalgamated under one banner as the Provincial Junior Hockey League.  The Midwestern Junior C Hockey League became the Doherty Division and were aligned in the Southern Conference with the Bloomfield division.

Season-by-season standings

1963-1973
1973-1977
1977-1982
1982-2002
2002-2009

Notable alumni
Jim Nahrgang
John Tanner

External links
New Hamburg Firebirds official website
OHA Homepage

References

Niagara Junior C Hockey League teams